Laccophilus quadrilineatus is a species of predaceous diving beetle in the family Dytiscidae. It is found in North America and the Neotropics.

Subspecies
These three subspecies belong to the species Laccophilus quadrilineatus:
 Laccophilus quadrilineatus mayae Zimmerman, 1970
 Laccophilus quadrilineatus quadrilineatus Horn, 1871
 Laccophilus quadrilineatus tehuanensis Zimmerman, 1970

References

Further reading

 
 

Dytiscidae
Articles created by Qbugbot
Beetles described in 1871